Benjamin Brian Castro (born December 22, 1989), better known by his stage name Sebastian Castro, is an American actor, singer, and YouTube sensation. He is an internet celebrity with a sizeable following in Southeast Asia.

Castro is most widely known for his viral gay-themed music video "Bubble," which garnered over three million views. "Bubble" brought Castro fame across South East Asia, most visibly in the Philippines and Indonesia.

Early life & Personal life
Born in Long Island, New York, Castro was raised in both New York and Georgia. At age 17, he was disowned by his parents for being gay, leading him to finance his education independently in the Savannah College of Art and Design.

Sebastian Castro came out as gay on a Philippine Podcast Beki Nights shortly after releasing his viral music video. When asked why he chose to come out on the GMA Network show H.O.T. TV, he responded, "I know there are lots of people out there that are scared to be themselves."

In 2014, Sebastian Castro and former ABS-CBN Reporter Ryan Chua publicly acknowledged their relationship over social media. Castro made the announcement during a trip to London where Ryan was undergoing a masters program from City University of London. After a public 4-year relationship, the two separated in September 2017.

In April of the following year, several showbiz outlets romantically linked Castro to Actor/TV Host Paolo Ballesteros after photos of them together surfaced. Neither ever publicly commented on the rumors. In June, Castro acknowledged that a relationship had ended, but never identified who it was with.

Career
On February 14, 2013, Castro's first music video "Bubble" appeared on YouTube, quickly garnering over 3 million views. Bubble further popularized the dance crazy "Bubble Pop," particularly in the Philippines.  The music video was Sebastian Castro's "coming out." Prior to releasing the homo-erotic Bubble music video, Castro was not publicly open about his sexuality.

Castro has landed several major product endorsements in SouthEast Asia, including Jollibee, Pantene Hair, and Sun Cellular.   He was featured among the Philippine Cosmopolitan Bachelors of 2012 and is currently an endorser of Fujifilm, Durex, Cathy Valencia, and Blued.

After being cast in several minor and supporting roles on TV and Film over the course of five years, Sebastian Castro appeared in his first lead role in full feature film 4 Days (2017), an independent film by Filipino director Adolfo Alix Jr.

PLM Film Society heralded the film as "one of the more inventive films of the genre in recent memory," adding "Mikoy Morales and Sebastian Castro complement each other onscreen, Morales with his tough and heartbreaking take on Mark, and Castro filling Derek full of reservations, doubts and an unspoken multitude of feelings."

Film

References

External links
 
 
 

1989 births
American expatriates in the Philippines
American people of Peruvian descent
American people of Japanese descent
Male actors from New York (state)
American LGBT singers
LGBT people from New York (state)
Living people
American gay actors
American gay musicians
People from Oceanside, New York
20th-century American LGBT people
21st-century American LGBT people